This is a complete list of South Korean films that received a domestic theatrical release in 2006.

Source for release dates and box-office admission results (except where cited otherwise): Koreanfilm.org.

Box office
The highest-grossing South Korean films released in 2006, by domestic box office gross revenue, are as follows:

Films released

See also 
 2006 in South Korea
 2006 in South Korean music
 Box office number-one films of 2006 (South Korea)

References

External links 

 Commercial Releases in 2006 at Koreanfilm.org

2006
Box
South Korean